Syedi Lukman ji bin Syedi Dawood Bhai was an Ismaili Dawoodi Bohra saint who lived in the 17-18th century in India. His family settled in Udaipur, coming from Gujarat during Udaipur's establishment. He was associate (Mawazeen) of 40th Dai Syedna  Hebatullah-il-Moayed Fiddeen. He has served three Dai from Syedna Ismail Badruddin II to Syedna Moayed. Syedi Lukman ji saheb died on the 29th of Rajab 1177AH/1764AD . His shrine (dargah) is in Udaipur, in the locality of  Bohra wadi.

He was also a noted poet and had command in many languages including Arabic, Urdu, Gujrati, Hindi, Sanskrit and, local Mewadi. "Hamd Rabbana" (Praise of God) and "Chalis Sikhaman" (40 advice) are amongst his famous literary work. His created verses are recited in most of Dawoodi Bohra occasions. 

He has family links with Dawoodi Bohra Dais. Current Dai syedna Mufaddal Saifuddin is from his progeny

References

Indian Muslims
Dawoodi Bohras